Leung Kwok Wai (born 23 February 1986 in Hong Kong), is a former Hong Kong professional footballer who currently plays as a defender for Hong Kong First Division League club North District.

Club career

Tuen Mun
Leung, starter his football career at Tuen Mun. Later, he joined the club in 2006, when the club were still competing in the Third 'District' Division. He was one of the three players who helped the club promote to the First Division from Third Division. Since his arrival at the club, he was the first choice centre-back of the club, even when the club were competing in the First Division. However, Tuen Mun confirmed his departure after the end of the 2011–12 season, stating that the club wanted to make a change.

Yokohama FC Hong Kong
Leung, along with his Tuen Mun centre-back partner Čedomir Mijanović, joined fellow First Division club Yokohama FC Hong Kong.

Eastern
On 11 June 2013, Leung joined newly promoted First Division club Eastern on a free transfer.

Dreams FC
On 18 July 2017, Leung joined newly rebranded HKPL club Dreams FC.

Career stats

Club
 As of 4 May 2013

Personal life
On 25 October 2012, Leung and his wife Fiona Wong married after 3 years of dating.

Notes
1.  Others include Hong Kong Third Division Champion Play-off.
2.  Since Tuen Mun were competing in lower divisions, they could only join the Junior Shield instead of Senior Shield.
3.  Hong Kong Junior Challenge Shield was not held in the 2009–10 season.

References

External links
 
 Leung Kwok Wai at HKFA

1986 births
Living people
Association football defenders
Hong Kong footballers
Hong Kong Premier League players
Hong Kong First Division League players
Tuen Mun SA players
Yokohama FC Hong Kong players
Eastern Sports Club footballers
TSW Pegasus FC players
Dreams Sports Club players